Dan Arvizu is a mechanical engineer at the United States Department of Energy (DOE) National Laboratories, where he has taken on various roles over the course of more than 30 years. Arvizu is also an expert in energy materials, technology commercialization and process sciences. He is a leader in higher education that is determined to harness education, research, and outreach initiatives to promote economic development and social mobility. Since 2021, he has been a member of the President’s Council of Advisors on Science and Technology (PCAST).

Career
Arvizu was the first Hispanic to lead the DOE national laboratory, where he also was the former director and chief executive of the National Renewable Energy Laboratory, and currently director emeritus. He served as board chair to the National Science Board (NSB), where he was appointed the position by Presidents George W. Bush and Barack Obama.

Arvizu is a member of the National Academy of Engineering (NAE) and National Academy of Public Administration. Dan Arvizu since 2018 has been serving as the chancellor of New Mexico State University and Chief Executive of the New Mexico State University System.

References

Living people
Mechanical engineers
Members of the United States National Academy of Engineering
Fellows of the United States National Academy of Public Administration
Year of birth missing (living people)